The Chaldean dynasty, also known as the Neo-Babylonian dynasty and enumerated as Dynasty X of Babylon, was the ruling dynasty of the Neo-Babylonian Empire, ruling as kings of Babylon from the ascent of Nabopolassar in 626 BC to the fall of Babylon in 539 BC. The dynasty, as connected to Nabopolassar through descent, was deposed in 560 BC by the Aramean official Neriglissar (560–556 BC), though he was connected to the Chaldean kings through marriage and his son and successor, Labashi-Marduk (556 BC), might have reintroduced the bloodline to the throne. The final Neo-Babylonian king, Nabonidus (556–539 BC), was genealogically unconnected to the previous kings, but might, like Neriglissar, also have been connected to the dynasty through marriage.

History 
The term "Chaldean dynasty", and the corresponding "Chaldean Empire", an alternate historiographical name for the Neo-Babylonian Empire, derives from the assumption that the dynasty's founder, Nabopolassar, was of Chaldean origin. Though contemporary sources suggest an origin in southern Mesopotamia, such as the Uruk prophecy text describing Nabopolassar as a "king of the sea" (i.e. southernmost Babylonia) and a letter from the Assyrian king Sinsharishkun describing him as "of the lower sea" (also southernmost Babylonia), there is no source that ascribes him a specific ethnic origin. Since the Chaldeans lived in southernmost Mesopotamia, many historians have identified Nabopolassar as Chaldean, but others have referred to him as Assyrian or Babylonian.

The issue is compounded by the fact that Nabopolassar never wrote of his ancestry, going as far as identifying himself as a "son of a nobody". This is almost certainly a lie since an actual son of a nobody, i.e. an obscure figure, would have been unable to gather enough influence to become king of Babylon. There is several pieces of evidence that links Nabopolassar and his dynasty to the city of Uruk (which was located south of Babylon), prominently that several of Nabopolassar's descendants lived in the city and that his son and successor, Nebuchadnezzar II, worked as a priest there before becoming king. In 2007, the Assyriologist Michael Jursa identified Nabopolassar as the son of Nebuchadnezzar (or Kudurru), a governor of Uruk who had been appointed by the Neo-Assyrian king Ashurbanipal. This Nebuchadnezzar belonged to a prominent political family in Uruk, which would explain how Nabopolassar could rise to power, and the names of his relatives correspond to names later given to Nabopolassar's descendants, possibly indicating a familial relationship through patronymics. As Nabopolassar spent his reign fighting the Assyrians, calling himself a "son of a nobody" instead of associating himself with a pro-Assyrian governor might have been politically advantageous.

Nabopolassar's descendants ruled Babylonia until his grandson, Amel-Marduk, was deposed by the general and official Neriglissar in 560 BC. Neriglissar was powerful and influential prior to becoming king, but was not related to the dynasty by blood, instead likely being of Aramean origin, probably of the Puqudu clan. He was not completely unconnected to the Chaldean dynasty, however, having secured his claim to the throne through marriage to one of Nebuchadnezzar II's daughters, possibly Kaššaya. Neriglissar was succeeded by his son, Labashi-Marduk, who was deposed shortly thereafter. Why Labashi-Marduk was deposed is not known, but it is possible that he was the son of Neriglissar and a wife other than Nebuchadnezzar II's daughter, and thus completely unconnected to the Chaldean dynasty. 

The leader of the coup to depose Labashi-Marduk was likely the courtier Belshazzar, who in Labashi-Marduk's place proclaimed Nabonidus, Belshazzar's father, as king. The sources suggest that while he was part of the conspiracy, Nabonidus had not intended, nor expected, to become king himself and he was hesitant to accept the nomination. Nabonidus's rise to the throne put Belshazzar first in the line of succession (it would not have been suitable for him to have become king himself while his father was still alive) and also made him one of the wealthiest men in Babylonia as he inherited Labashi-Marduk's family's estates. It is probable that Nabonidus, like Neriglissar, was also married to a daughter of Nebuchadnezzar II and that this was the method in which he had secured a claim to the throne. This would also explain later traditions that Belshazzar was a descendant of Nebuchadnezzar II. Nabonidus appears to have been a devotee of the god Sîn, though the extent to which he might have attempted to elevate Sîn over Babylon's national deity Marduk is disputed. Subsequent Babylonians appear to have remembered Nabonidus as unorthodox and misguided, though not insane or necessarily a bad ruler. Belshazzar never became king and Babylon ultimately fell under Nabonidus's leadership, as Cyrus the Great of the Achaemenid Empire invaded Babylonia in 539 BC and put an end to the Neo-Babylonian Empire. The fates of Nabonidus and Belshazzar are not known. Nabonidus may have been allowed to live and retire but it is typically assumed that Belshazzar was killed.

Family tree of the Chaldean dynasty 
Broadly follows Wiseman (1983). The reconstruction of Nabopolassar's ancestry follows Jursa (2007), Neriglissar's ancestry follows Wiseman (1991) and the children of Nebuchadnezzar II follow Beaulieu (1998) and Wiseman (1983). It is not clear whether Labashi-Marduk and Gigitum were Neriglissar's children by Kashshaya, or by another wife unrelated to the ruling dynasty. It is also not certain that Nabonidus actually married one of Nebuchadnezzar's daughters, which puts some uncertainty on the assumption that Belshazzar and his siblings were descendants of Nebuchadnezzar. The birth order of any of the children, besides Nebuchadnezzar being Nabopolassar's oldest son and Nabu-shum-lishir being Nabopolassar's second son, is uncertain.

Timeline of Neo-Babylonian rulers

Notes

References

Bibliography

Web sources 

 

|-

|-

Babylonian dynasties
Neo-Babylonian Empire
7th-century BC people
6th-century BC people
Chaldean dynasty